Samuel Croudson Williams (September 13, 1812  – May 12, 1862) was a nineteenth-century American politician from Virginia.

Early life
Williams was born in Woodstock, Virginia in 1812.

Career

As an adult, Williams made his home in Shenandoah County.

Williams was appointed Deputy Clerk of Shenandoah County for ten years, and Clerk from 1845-1862 at his death.

From 1841-1843, Williams was elected to the General Assembly.

An active partisan Democrat, Williams was a delegate to the National Democratic Convention of 1844, 1848, 1852 and 1856.

In 1850, Williams was elected to the Virginia Constitutional Convention of 1850. He was one of four delegates elected from the Valley delegate district made up of his home district of Shenandoah County as well as Hardy and Warren Counties.

Williams was an officer of the Manassas Gap Railroad Company.

Williams was elected to the Virginia Secession Convention of 1861 and voted for secession.

During the American Civil War, Williams was elected the captain of a rifle company that he commanded at Harper’s Ferry.

Death
Samuel Croudson Williams died in Woodstock, Virginia on May 12, 1862.

References

Bibliography
 

Members of the Virginia House of Delegates
1812 births
1862 deaths
People from Woodstock, Virginia
People of Virginia in the American Civil War
19th-century American politicians